Pietro Doimo Munzani (4 December 1890 – 28 January 1951) was the Roman Catholic Archbishop of Zadar.

Life
Munzani was born on 4 December 1890 in Zara in Dalmatia, then Austria-Hungary.

Between 1918 and 1947 Zara was part of the Kingdom of Italy. After the Province of Zara was occupied by the Yugoslav partisans, Munzani was arrested by Yugoslav Communists on March 7, 1945. He was forced to resign on December 11, 1948. He died in exile on January 28, 1951.

Notes

1890 births
1951 deaths
Archbishops of Zadar
20th-century Roman Catholic archbishops in Croatia